Subramaniam Ramesh, popularly known as S.Ramesh is an Indian cricketer, who has represented Kerala  in 56 first-class matches, as an all rounder between 1977 and 1990. Ramesh, has also captained the state. He, along with his cricketer brothers S.Santosh and S Rajesh, played an integral role in making Kerala cricket team, a notable one of South India in 80's. Ramesh is also a cricket administrator at KCA.

References

External links
 

  
1954 births
Living people
Kerala cricketers
Indian cricketers
South Zone cricketers
Cricketers from Thiruvananthapuram